Ninian Sanderson (14 May 1925 – 1 October 1985) was a Scottish car dealer, sports car racing driver, and winner of the 1956 24 Hours of Le Mans.

Racing career
Sanderson was born in Glasgow. In common with many drivers of his era, he cut his racing teeth in the highly competitive 500cc Formula 3 class in the early 1950s. He is best known for winning the 1956 24 Hours of Le Mans for the Ecurie Ecosse team, together with Ron Flockhart in an ex-works Jaguar D-Type. The following year Sanderson again competed for Ecurie Ecosse, finishing second with co-driver John "Jock" Lawrence, only beaten by the other Ecurie Ecosse D-Type driven by Flockhart and Ivor Bueb.

He took part in several non-championship Formula Two and Formula One races with Ecurie Ecosse, with a best result of third in the 1952 Scotland National Trophy and 1952 Joe Fry Memorial Trophy. He was a reserve driver with the team for the 1953 British Grand Prix but did not compete in the race.

In 1999 the Jaguar sports car that won the 1956 24 Hours of Le Mans was sold at Christie's in London for £1.71 million. At that time it was the most expensive car ever bought at auction.

Although reputedly not the easiest of men to get along with, Ninian Sanderson was well known in racing circles for his lively sense of humour. Fond of practical jokes he was not averse to putting firecrackers up exhaust pipes and ribbing members of the public with his race-bred black humour. The contrast in personalities within the Ecurie Ecosse team was stark; down-to-Earth, Glaswegian Sanderson, and refined, Edinburgh-born Flockhart were "like chalk and cheese".

Ninian was also a keen yachtsman and regularly raced his yachts on the Clyde with the same competitive spirit and ebullience as in his motor racing. He owned several beautiful Clyde boatyard McGruer-built yachts: a Dragon class keelboat named "Corsair" built in 1947 and an 8-metre class cruiser racer "Debbie" built in 1966. In 1974 he also commissioned McGruer to build his well-known 3/4-Tonner racing yacht "Nippie Sweetie".

In 1983 Sanderson and Jim Watt raised £10,500 for the medical oncology unit at the Glasgow Royal Infirmary following a sponsored canoe trip from Broomielaw to Tarbert, Loch Fyne. Sanderson had been receiving treatment at the unit for several years; he died of cancer in 1985. His wife Dorothy Sanderson died in 2007.

Educated at Strathallan School, in the announcement of his passing in the school magazine The Strathallian included a quote from F1 racing World champion Sir Jackie Stewart where Stewart described Sanderson as a 'perfectionist, with immense spirit and commitment.'

Racing record

Complete 24 Hours of Le Mans results

Note *: Not Classified because car failed to complete 80% of its Index of Performance distance.

Complete 12 Hours of Sebring results

References

External links

 Brief biography at historicracing.com
 Ninian Sanderson profile at The 500 Owners Association
 Ninian Sanderson's race results at racingsportscars.com

1925 births
1985 deaths
People educated at Strathallan School
Scottish racing drivers
Sportspeople from Glasgow
24 Hours of Le Mans drivers
24 Hours of Le Mans winning drivers
World Sportscar Championship drivers
12 Hours of Reims drivers
Ecurie Ecosse drivers